John Atwood may refer to:

 John Atwood (1643–1712), name in religion Peter Atwood, English Dominican
 John Atwood (colonial administrator) (1576–1644), Assistant Governor of the Plymouth Colony in the US state of Massachusetts
 John Atwood (American football) (1923–2008), American football player, oil executive
 John A. Atwood (1850–1930), American politician and businessman
 John Leland Atwood (1904–1999), American engineer and manager in the aerospace industry
 J. Brian Atwood (born 1942), American diplomat